This page shows the standings and results for Group C of the UEFA Euro 2012 qualifying tournament.

Standings

Matches
Group C fixtures were negotiated between the participants in a meeting held in Belgrade on 8 March 2010.

Goalscorers

Discipline

Notes

References 

Group C
2010–11 in Italian football
qual
2010–11 in Northern Ireland association football
2011–12 in Northern Ireland association football
2010–11 in Serbian football
2011–12 in Serbian football
2010–11 in Slovenian football
2011–12 in Slovenian football
2010 in Faroe Islands football
2011 in Faroe Islands football
2010 in Estonian football
2011 in Estonian football